The 1st Album is the debut studio album by German duo Modern Talking, released on 1 April 1985 by Hansa Records. The album reached number one in Germany on 27 May 1985, spending four weeks atop the chart and 18 weeks within the top 10. It was eventually certified platinum by the Bundesverband Musikindustrie (BVMI), denoting shipments in excess of 500,000 copies in Germany.

Singles
The album spawned two singles. The lead single, "You're My Heart, You're My Soul", topped the charts in Germany (where it spent four weeks at the top), Austria, Switzerland and Belgium, while charting inside the top five in France, Norway and Sweden. The second single, "You Can Win If You Want", reached number one in Germany and Austria, number two in Switzerland and Belgium, and the top 10 in France and the Netherlands. Both singles attained gold sales status in Germany, having each sold over 250,000 units.

Track listing

Personnel
 Dieter Bohlen – production, arrangements
 Manfred Vormstein – art direction, cover photo
 Fryderyk Gabowicz – artists photos

Charts

Weekly charts

Year-end charts

Certifications

Release history
 1985 Germany: LP Hansa 206 818-620.
 1985 Germany: MC Hansa 406 818-652.
 1985 Germany: CD Hansa 610 338-222

References

1985 debut albums
Hansa Records albums
Modern Talking albums